Death of  John Cotton
Louis Fraser publishes Zoologica Typica, or figures of the new and rare animals and birds in the collection of the Zoological Society of London
Death of  William Gambel
Death of  Johann Centurius Hoffmannsegg
Philip Henry Gosse publishes Popular British Ornithology; containing a familiar and technical description of the Birds of the British Isles, Illustrations of the Birds of Jamaica and Natural History. Birds 
Vinzenz Maria Gredler becomes director of the Franciscan Gymnasium in Bolzano 
Singapore Museum established 

Ongoing events
Fauna Japonica
Birding and ornithology by year
1849 in science